Ilse María Olivo Schweinfurth (born 28 November 1965) is a Venezuelan-Mexican singer and telenovela actress.

Biography
Ilse was born in Caracas, Venezuela, when her parents were there in a business trip. She was born to a well-known publicist in Mexico Oscar Olivo and to his Honduran wife Ilse Schweinfurth. She studied Communications at Universidad Anáhuac.  and at the age of 20 she became one of the three members of the vocal group Flans. Ilse performed the first single Bazar that made the group an instant success.

In 1989 she performed a duet with Pedro Maras on his debut self-titled album. The song, titled 'Sed' was published by BMG Music Publishing Company and is currently available on Spotify.

In 1990 the group broke up and Ilse became the host of the show Galardón a los grandes and launched a solo career in 1992 recording two albums. In 1997, Ilse obtained an important yet brief role in the telenovela María Isabel alongside Adela Noriega.

In 1999 she re-united with the other members of Flans to tour the country.

In 2003 she hosted the talk show 100% Mujer on Televisa. In 2005, Ilse became one of the judges of the TV Azteca singing competition La Academia.

She re toured with Flans again in late 2005 for 2 months. With happiness comes sorrow. She lost her sister Erika due to pneumonia on December 3, 2006. She is a single mother raising two young boys. Ilse is currently living in Mexico City.

Solo albums
 Africa (1992)
 El Río (1996)

Telenovelas
 'Maria Isabel' (1997) as Graciela Pereira

Television shows
 La Academia (2005) as judge
 100% mujer (2003) as host
 Plaza Sésamo (1996) as cast member
 Galardón a los grandes (1989) as host

Footnotes

External links
 

1965 births
Living people
La Academia judges
21st-century Mexican women singers
Mexican people of Honduran descent
Mexican telenovela actresses
Naturalized citizens of Mexico
Venezuelan emigrants to Mexico
Venezuelan people of German descent
20th-century Mexican women singers
Women in Latin music